Tshela (or Tsela) is the main town of Bas-fleuve district in Kongo Central Province in the Democratic Republic of Congo. The town was linked to the port of Boma by an isolated narrow gauge railway, the Mayumbe Line. This  gauge line lasted from 1889 to 1984.

References

populated places in Kongo Central